Lacertaspis chriswildi, also known commonly as Chris Wild's snake-eyed skink, Chris-Wild's snake-eyed skink, and Chris-Wild's lidless skink, is a species of lizard in the family Scincidae. The species is endemic to Cameroon.

Etymology
The specific name, chriswildi, is in honor of herpetologist Christopher Wild, who collected the holotype.

Habitat

Reproduction
The mode of reproduction of L. chriswildi is unknown.

References

Further reading
Böhme W, Schmitz A (1996). "A new lygosomine skink (Lacertilia: Scincidae: Panaspis) from Cameroon". Revue Suisse de Zoologie 103 (3): 767–774. (Panaspis chriswildi, new species).
Chirio L, LeBreton M (2007). Atlas des reptiles du Cameroun. Paris: Publications scientifiques du Muséum national d'histoire naturelle. 688 pp. . (in French).
Schmitz A, Ineich I, Chirio L (2005). "Molecular review of the genus Panaspis sensu lato (Reptilia: Scincidae) in Cameroon, with special reference to the status of the proposed subgenera". Zootaxa 863: 1–28. (Lacertaspis chriswildi, new combination).

Lacertaspis
Skinks of Africa
Reptiles of Cameroon
Endemic fauna of Cameroon
Reptiles described in 1996
Taxa named by Wolfgang Böhme (herpetologist)
Taxa named by Andreas Schmitz